In Greek mythology, Delphus (Ancient Greek: Δέλφος,  Delphos) was the person from whom the town of Delphi was believed to have derived its name.

Biography 
Delphus was said to be the son of Poseidon and Melantho (Melantheia), daughter of Deucalion. In other accounts, he was the son of Apollo by Celaeno, the daughter of Hyamus and granddaughter of Lycorus, and, according to others, by Thyia, the daughter of the autochthon Castalius, or by Melaina, the daughter of Cephissus. He is further said to have had a son, Pythis, who ruled over the country about Mount Parnassus, and from whom the oracle received the name of Pytho.

In yet another version, his mother is Melanis, a daughter of Hyamus and Melantheia, and father is not mentioned; Delphus is said to have inherited his grandfather's kingdom in the neighborhood of Mount Parnassus, to have married Castalia, and to have had two children, a son Castalius and a daughter Phemonoe, the first person to write hexameters. His grandson through Castalius was Laphrius, and his great-grandson through Laphrius was Noutius.

Notes

References 

 Pausanias, Description of Greece with an English Translation by W.H.S. Jones, Litt.D., and H.A. Ormerod, M.A., in 4 Volumes. Cambridge, MA, Harvard University Press; London, William Heinemann Ltd. 1918. . Online version at the Perseus Digital Library
 Pausanias, Graeciae Descriptio. 3 vols. Leipzig, Teubner. 1903.  Greek text available at the Perseus Digital Library.
 Publius Ovidius Naso, Metamorphoses translated by Brookes More (1859-1942). Boston, Cornhill Publishing Co. 1922. Online version at the Perseus Digital Library.
 Publius Ovidius Naso, Metamorphoses. Hugo Magnus. Gotha (Germany). Friedr. Andr. Perthes. 1892. Latin text available at the Perseus Digital Library.

Princes in Greek mythology
Kings of Phocis
Kings in Greek mythology
Children of Poseidon
Children of Apollo
Demigods in classical mythology
Phocian characters in Greek mythology
Mythology of Phocis
Delphi